DNE may refer to:

The convention of circling important information (such as URLs, or assignments) and marking it DNE (short for do not erase) on chalkboards in academic institutions with shared lecture facilities.
In mathematics it may be used as an abbreviation to illustrate that a proper solution to some problem Does Not Exist.
In logic it may be used as an abbreviation referring to the law of double negation elimination.
In engineering it may be used as an abbreviation to illustrate the relation between variables, X1 Does Not Equal X2.
An abbreviation for "Did not enter" or "Do not enter"
An abbreviation for "Do not engage"
Do not equip, a term sometimes used in printed circuit board design to denote the omitting of a component
The National Livestock Department (Direction Nationale d'Elevage – DNE) of Mauritania, which manages different aspects of agriculture in that nation
Defining New Elegance – an English urban catchphrase by Alexander Hunter-Heslop, an international lifestyle critic
Direcção Nacional de Estatística, the national bureau for statistics of East Timor
D.Ne., an abbreviation used for the United States District Court for the District of Nebraska
Deterministic Network Enhancer, Citrix software that extends operating systems and network protocol devices and stacks to introduce measurement and controls